Adam Nathanson is an American musician currently based in Richmond, Virginia.  He is best known as the guitarist in the New York-based hardcore punk band Born Against, and the singer and guitarist in the proto-folk punk band (Young) Pioneers.

Musical career
Nathanson's early band Life's Blood played a politicized form of New York hardcore.  The group was extant from 1987–1989, and upon its demise, Nathanson and bassist Neil Burke formed Born Against with singer Sam McPheeters.  Born Against toured extensively and released several records before breaking up in 1993.

After Born Against, Nathanson formed and fronted the (Young) Pioneers, a group that would later influence the folk punk movement.  Early in their career, the (Young) Pioneers moved from McPheeters' Vermiform Records to the larger Lookout! Records label, where they released several records before disbanding in 1999.  During this era, Nathanson also briefly played in the post-Born Against group Men's Recovery Project.

Nathanson most recently formed Teargas Rock, a sporadically active group continuing in the direction of (Young) Pioneers.

Personal
Nathanson currently lives in Richmond with his wife and children, teaches adult literacy, and is involved in community organizing such as Food Not Bombs.

References

American punk rock musicians
Living people
Men's Recovery Project members
Born Against members
(Young) Pioneers members
Year of birth missing (living people)